AGCO may refer to:

 Alcohol and Gaming Commission of Ontario
 AGCO Corporation, an agricultural equipment manufacturer
 Auerbach Grayson, a stockbroker